Here I Am Drunk Again is the fifth album by country singer Moe Bandy, released in 1976 on the Columbia label recorded at Columbia Recording Studios, Nashville, Tennessee.

Track listing
"Here I Am Drunk Again" (Autry Inman/Jack Kay) - 2:27
"If I Had Someone To Cheat On" (J. R. Cochran) - 2:10
"What Happened To Our Love" (Sanger D. Shafer/Moe Bandy) - 2:20
"The Bottle's Holdin' Me" (Sanger D. Shafer) - 2:30
"Please Take Her Home" (Eddy Raven) - 2:40
"Mind Your Own Business" (Hank Williams) - 2:40
"She Took More Than Her Share" (Sanger D. Shafer) - 2:22
"She's Got That Oklahoma Look" (Sanger D. Shafer) - 1:53
"Then You Can Let Me Go (Out Of Your Mind)" (S. Collom) - 2:30
"The Man That You Once Knew" (Dallas Frazier) - 2:43

Musicians
Bob Moore
Leo Jackson
Kenny Malone
Johnny Gimble
Weldon Myrick
Hargus "Pig" Robbins
Charlie McCoy (Courtesy of Monument Records)
Dave Kirby
Bobby Thompson
Ray Edenton
Jerry Carrigan
Leon Rhodes
Henry Strzelecki
Shane Keister

Backing
The Jordanaires
The Nashville Edition

Production
Sound engineers - Lou Bradley, Ron Reynolds
Photography - Jim McGuire
Album design - Bill Barnes

1976 albums
Moe Bandy albums
Columbia Records albums
Albums produced by Ray Baker (music producer)